Charltona ortellus is a moth in the family Crambidae. It was described by Charles Swinhoe in 1887. It is found in India.

References

Crambinae
Moths described in 1887
Taxa named by Charles Swinhoe